Ditto Music is an online music distribution company. It distributes music to 160 digital music stores, including Spotify, iTunes, Google Play, Amazon, Vevo, Apple Music, Beatport, Deezer, and Shazam. It currently operates from its head office in Liverpool, England. And, as of 2017 it has 22 offices across 19 countries.

History
In January 2007, Ditto Music distributed "Blag, Steal & Borrow" by Essex band Koopa, which entered into the UK Top 40, making it the first chart hit by an unsigned band, this achievement is in the Guinness Book Of World Records

Services
Ditto's main distribution service offers unlimited releases to all major online stores on an annual subscription basis starting from £19 per year. The company claims to operate non-exclusive deals with artists keeping 100% of their royalty earnings.

Alongside its core music distribution service, Ditto Music also offers record label services including PR, social media and playlist pitching to independent artists. In 2021, Ditto added music publishing to its range of services for artists.

Awards and nominations
Won the RECSS Customer Support Award in 2011 for 'Best Online Service Provider.

Nominated for Best Distribution Team at the Music Week Awards in 2013.

Nominated for Best Label/Artist Services Company at the Music Week Awards in 2017 and 2018.

Named on The Sunday Times Fast Track 100 list of Britain's fastest-growing companies in 2017 and SME Export Track 100 in 2018.

Criticisms
In January 2022, rapper Lil Yachty named Ditto Music in a trademark infringement lawsuit filed against NFT seller service Opulous, claiming that Opulous company "maliciously" used his name and likeness to raise more than $6.5 million in venture capital funds.

The companies issued a response to the lawsuit stating that contrary to the assertions in the complaint filed by Lil Yachty, their uses of Lil Yachty’s name and likeness were all authorized by Lil Yachty and his representatives as well as their intentions to "vigorously defend ourselves against these meritless claims".

References

Internet properties established in 2008
Digital audio distributors